Nagarjuna Sagar Airport is an airport located in Guntur District in the state of Andhra Pradesh, India. The airport is used by private and chartered aircraft and has no scheduled services. There are plans to upgrade the facility to enable scheduled commercial operations. In March 2020, the Airports Authority of India announced it was considering developing the airport into a water aerodrome for use by seaplanes.

References

Airports in Andhra Pradesh
Transport in Andhra Pradesh
Guntur district
Airports with year of establishment missing